Michal Nguyễn (born 4 December 1989) is a Vietnamese-Czech footballer who plays as a defender for V.League 1 side Hải Phòng. He is a member of the Vietnam national football team. Michal Nguyễn was born in the Czech Republic to a Vietnamese father and a Czech mother.

See also
 List of Vietnam footballers born outside Vietnam

References

External links 

1989 births
Living people
Vietnamese footballers
Vietnam international footballers
Vietnamese expatriate footballers
Czech people of Vietnamese descent
Vietnamese people of Czech descent
Becamex Binh Duong FC players
Sportspeople of Vietnamese descent
V.League 1 players
Association football defenders
Michal Nguyen